Forchach is a municipality in the district of Reutte in the Austrian state of Tyrol.

Geography
Forchach is located in the Lech Valley, on the edge of Lechau. The municipality extends from the river Lech up to 2227 m high Schwarzhanskarspitze in the Lechtal Alps.

History
Forchach was first mentioned in 1200 as "Vorhach" (pine).

Economy
The community is based on agriculture, tourism and a small industrial sector.

Cities and towns in Reutte District